Jeremy Nigel Sands (born 9 January 1944) is an English-born Scottish former first-class cricketer.

Sands was born in England at Carshalton in January 1944. He was educated in Scotland at the Edinburgh Academy, where he played for the rugby fifteen as a fly-half. From there he went up to the University of Edinburgh. Sands made his debut in first-class cricket for the Marylebone Cricket Club (MCC) against Scotland at Glasgow in 1965. In the same year he made two further appearances in first-class cricket for Scotland against the touring New Zealanders at Hamilton Crescent and Ireland at Dublin. He made a final first-class appearance in 1967, for the MCC against Scotland. In four first-class matches, Sands scored 37 runs with a highest score of 17.

References

External links

1944 births
Living people
Alumni of the University of Edinburgh
Cricketers from Carshalton
Marylebone Cricket Club cricketers
People educated at Edinburgh Academy
Scottish cricketers